Jennifer Antony is an Indian actress and model. She took part in the beauty pageant contest Miss Bangalore and won it in 1992, gained popularity and entered into the Kannada and Malayalam film industry. She is also a professional painter.

Filmography

TV series

References

Year of birth missing (living people)
Living people
Indian film actresses
Indian beauty pageant winners
Actresses in Malayalam cinema
Actresses in Kannada cinema
Actresses in Tamil cinema
Indian television actresses
Actresses in Malayalam television
Actresses in Tamil television
Actresses in Kannada television